Gran Hermano (as known by the acronym GH) is a reality television series broadcast in Spain on Telecinco produced by Zeppelin TV (part of the Endemol Shine Iberia). It is part of the Big Brother franchise first developed in the Netherlands. The Spanish version of Big Brother was the first reality show to be broadcast in the country, which obtained a 36.5% rating share in its premiere and was an audience leader.

The show became an instant success, reaching over ten million in its first two seasons.

Due to the low audience of the eighteenth season, Telecinco decided to cancel the regular edition and continue to produce Gran Hermano VIP and the spin-off Gran Hermano Dúo.

As of February 2020, 30 seasons of the show have aired (eighteen regular seasons, seven VIP seasons, and five spin-off seasons). It is the longest-running series in Big Brother franchise worldwide, currently on air.

Format
Based on the original Dutch version created by John de Mol, the show sees several different housemates, divided by gender, social backgrounds and geographical locations locked up together in a house, where the viewing public can watch them twenty-four hours a day, and vote them out of the house as they choose to. The housemates live in isolation from the outside world in a house custom built with everyday objects, like home appliances and a garden. The house also includes cameras and microphones in most of the rooms recording all of the activities on the premises. The only place where housemates can be away from the other contestants is in the confession room, where they can express their true feelings. The winner is the last contestant remaining in the house and receives a cash prize. Housemates are evicted weekly throughout the show by the viewing public.

The show's name comes from George Orwell's 1948 novel 1984, a dystopia in which Big Brother is the all-seeing, omnipotent leader of Oceania.

The galas (eviction & nomination show) broadcast on Thursdays, presented by Mercedes Milá from 2000 to 2001 and 2002 to 2015. Jorge Javier Vázquez replaced Mercedes Milá from 2016. The weekly debate show is presented by Jordi González on Sundays and the highlights show from the previous day being shown daily. Límte 48 horas on Tuesdays and Última Hora is presented by Jordi González on the set and Lara Álvarez from the editorial office on Mondays.

Following the success of the format, Telecinco developed different versions of the format. In 2004, Gran Hermano VIP aired, is the version with celebrity housemates, which have aired seven seasons.

In 2010, El Reencuentro premiered, which aired two seasons, the first season is with pairs of Gran Hermano housemates who entered the house again to sort out unfinished matters, and the second season is with contestants from different reality shows of Telecinco.

In 2019, Gran Hermano Dúo aired, it's a variant of the celebrity format which the housemates entered the house with a current or former relationship and coupled-up.

Series details

Regular seasons

Celebrity seasons

El Reencuentro seasons

Spin-off seasons

Presenters and programmes

References

External links
 Gran Hermano Official website on Telecinco
 Gran Hermano VIP Official website on Telecinco

Gran Hermano (Spanish TV series)
Telecinco original programming
2000 Spanish television series debuts
Spanish reality television series
Spanish television series based on non-Spanish television series
Television shows filmed in Spain